The  is a railway line in western Japan operated by West Japan Railway Company (JR West). The line connects Shin-Yamaguchi Station in Yamaguchi, Yamaguchi and Masuda Station in Masuda, Shimane.

History
The Ogori (now Shin-Yamaguchi) - Yamaguchi section opened in 1913, and the line was progressively extended north, reaching Masuda in 1923.

CTC signalling was commissioned in 1984.

Proposed connecting line
 Nichihara Station: The Gannichi Line was proposed to be extended to this station, and construction commenced in 1967. About 50% of the roadbed had been completed when construction was abandoned in 1980.

Services
The Super Oki limited express connects Shin-Yamaguchi Station with Yonago Station and Tottori Station on the Sanin Main Line via the Yamaguchi Line.

The line is also famous for the operation of the rapid SL Yamaguchi steam train.

Stations
●：Train stops
｜：Train passes
 "Local" trains stop at every station.

See also
 List of railway lines in Japan

References
This article incorporates material from the corresponding article in the Japanese Wikipedia.

Lines of West Japan Railway Company
Rail transport in Yamaguchi Prefecture
Rail transport in Shimane Prefecture
1067 mm gauge railways in Japan